Pro Wrestling Noah is a Japanese professional wrestling promotion founded in 2000. During the years, the promotion has held various notable pay-per-view events which feature professional wrestling matches that resulted from scripted storylines, where wrestlers portrayed villains, heroes, or less distinguishable characters in the scripted events that built tension and culminated in a wrestling match or series of matches.

Annual tournaments

Past Events

2004

2005

2021

2022

2023

Upcoming events

Shared events

New Japan Pro Wrestling
Starting with 2022, Pro Wrestling Noah began organizing exhibition matches as part of various events promoted by New Japan Pro Wrestling, mainly the Wrestle Kingdom branch. All the matches usually took place in the second or third night of the event, dedicated to inter-promotional competition. The bouts are preponderantly scripted as tag team matches in which Noah's wrestlers compete under the banner of their respective units against the wrestlers from NJPW's units.

See also
List of Pro Wrestling Noah personnel

References

External links

Wrestling-Titles.com: Pro Wrestling Noah

Pro Wrestling Noah
Pro Wrestling Noah shows
2021 in professional wrestling
2022 in professional wrestling
Professional wrestling-related lists